Lee Sang-gyun (born 1931) is a South Korean wrestler. He competed in the men's freestyle bantamweight at the 1956 Summer Olympics.

References

External links
 

1931 births
Possibly living people
South Korean male sport wrestlers
Olympic wrestlers of South Korea
Wrestlers at the 1956 Summer Olympics
Place of birth missing (living people)